This is a list of the largest municipalities of Canadian provinces and territories by population as of the 2011 Census. Capitals are designated in italics.

References 

Demographics of Canada
Canada, largest
Provinces and territories' largest municipalities